Glenn Hank Greenberg (born January 22, 1947) is the managing director and founder of Brave Warrior Advisors, a privately owned investment advisory firm.

Early life 
He was born to a Jewish family in New York City, the son of Caral Gimbel (daughter of Bernard Gimbel and sister of Bruce Alva Gimbel and Peter Gimbel) and Hank Greenberg. His father was a Hall of Fame baseball player and his mother's family founded Gimbel Brothers department stores and acquired Saks Fifth Avenue. His mother was previously married and divorced from Edward Lasker, son of Albert Lasker; and after divorcing his father, married World War II hero, Joseph M. Lebworth.

Greenberg grew up in Cleveland where his father was general manager of the Cleveland Indians and later attended Phillips Academy Andover. He earned a BA in English at Yale, an MA in Literature at NYU, and an MBA from Columbia University. He was a three-year starter at defensive tackle and later the fourth-ranked US squash amateur.

Career 
Greenberg taught high school and was a school principal before enrolling at Columbia in 1971. Upon graduation he worked for five years in the Pension group at Morgan Guaranty Trust as an analyst and portfolio manager. He joined Central-National Gottesman in 1978 to work for Arthur Ross and later Edgar Wachenheim. In 1984 he and John Shapiro founded Chieftain Capital Management, whose name was changed to Brave Warrior in 2010 when the partners separated.

Personal life
In 1971, Greenberg married Judith Bruce in a Baptist ceremony in New York City; they later divorced. In 1976, Greenberg married Georgia Sarchet Shreve in a Roman Catholic ceremony in St. Paul's Chapel of Columbia University. In 2001, Greenberg married Linda Vester - also a Roman Catholic - in New York City. They have four children in addition to Greenberg's three children from his previous marriages.

References 

1947 births
Living people
20th-century American Jews
Columbia Business School alumni
Yale University alumni
New York University alumni
Phillips Academy alumni
Gimbel family
21st-century American Jews